B-flat minor is a minor scale based on B, consisting of the pitches B, C, D, E, F, G, and A. Its key signature has five flats. Its relative major is D-flat major and its parallel major is B-flat major. Its enharmonic equivalent, A-sharp minor, which would contain seven sharps, is not normally used.

The B-flat natural minor scale is:

Changes needed for the melodic and harmonic versions of the scale are written in with accidentals as necessary. The B-flat harmonic minor and melodic minor scales are:

Characteristics 
B-flat minor is traditionally a 'dark' key.

The old valveless horn was barely capable of playing in B-flat minor: the only example found in 18th-century music is a modulation that occurs in the first minuet of Franz Krommer's Concertino in D major, Op. 80.

Notable classical compositions

 Charles-Valentin Alkan
 Prelude Op. 31, No. 12 (Le temps qui n'est plus)
 Symphony for Solo Piano, 3rd movement: Menuet
Samuel Barber
Adagio for Strings
Frédéric Chopin
Piano Sonata No. 2 "Funeral March"
Nocturne Op. 9 No. 1
Scherzo No. 2
Prelude Op. 28, No. 16 "Hades"
Mazurka Op. 24, No. 4
Sergei Rachmaninoff
Piano Sonata No. 2, Op. 36
Dmitri Shostakovich
Symphony No. 13, Op. 113 ("Babi Yar")
String Quartet No. 13, Op. 138
Richard Strauss
An Alpine Symphony begins and ends in B-flat minor.
Pyotr Ilyich Tchaikovsky
Piano Concerto No. 1
Marche slave
William Walton
Symphony No. 1

References

External links

Musical keys
Minor scales